Frederic Charles Willard (September 18, 1933 May 15, 2020) was an American actor, comedian, and writer. He was best known for his work with Christopher Guest in This Is Spinal Tap (1984), Waiting for Guffman (1996), Best in Show (2000), A Mighty Wind (2003), For Your Consideration (2006), and Mascots (2016), and for playing Ed Harken in the Anchorman films. He also appeared in films like Austin Powers: The Spy Who Shagged Me, American Wedding and WALL-E. He won two Primetime Emmy Award nominations for playing Frank Dunphy on the sitcom Modern Family.

Early life
Frederic Charles Willard was born in Cleveland, Ohio, on September 18, 1933. Willard's mother, Ruth (née Weinman) was a housewife.  His father, Frederick Charles Willard, died in 1945 when he was 12 years old. He was raised in Shaker Heights, Ohio.

Willard graduated from the Kentucky Military Institute in 1951 and the Virginia Military Institute in 1955. He was stationed in Germany while serving in the United States Army.

Career

Early career
Willard's stage career began when he moved to New York in the late 1950s. His initial work included a production of Desperate Hours at a local YMCA where he worked with future comedy partner Vic Grecco. They later performed as Willard & Grecco in the Greenwich Village area, found some success touring, and appeared on The Dean Martin Show, The Smothers Brothers Comedy Hour and The Tonight Show. They were offered roles in the television series Get Smart and The Carol Burnett Show, but the offers fell through due to poor management. The two parted ways in 1968.

Willard's film debut was in the 1967 exploitation film Teenage Mother. He later reported that the audience at one screening booed when his character interrupted an attempted sexual assault of the female lead.

One of Willard's earliest performing jobs was at The Second City, Chicago, where he shared the stage with Robert Klein and David Steinberg. He was a founding member of the improvisational comedy group Ace Trucking Company, whose other members included Michael Mislove and Bill Saluga. They performed sketches on The Tonight Show With Johnny Carson over 50 times, and appeared regularly on This is Tom Jones.

Rise to prominence
Willard achieved wider fame in 1977–78 as Barth Gimble's (Martin Mull) sidekick and announcer Jerry Hubbard on the Mary Hartman, Mary Hartman spinoffs Fernwood 2 Night, Forever Fernwood and America 2-Night, which parodied the nighttime talk shows of the day. He was an original cast member of the NBC series Real People in 1979, then again from 1981 to 1983. He played Tom Osbourne in the 1987 Academy Award–winning short film Ray's Male Heterosexual Dance Hall. From 1987 to 1989 he starred as a bartender/straightman in Sid and Marty Krofft's D.C. Follies, and was host to the Krofft puppets portraying political figures of the time.

Willard hosted the talk show What's Hot, What's Not, which aired from 1985 to 1986 and earned him a daytime Emmy nomination for Outstanding Talk Show Host.

In 1990, Willard hosted the cable TV show Access America on the Ha! Comedy Network. As part of that show, on September 21, 1990, he appeared in episode 7 of the cult public-access television show Decoupage with Summer Caprice. In 1995, Willard reunited with his Fernwood co-star playing Scott, the romantic partner of Mull's character Leon Carp, on Roseanne. The couple married in the episode "December Bride", and Scott became a recurring character during the series' final two seasons. That same year, Willard guest-starred in three episodes of Sister, Sister, starring Tia and Tamera Mowry; Willard played Carl Mitushka, a teacher at Roosevelt High who often spoke popular teenage slang terms in order to sound cool to his students. Willard voiced travel agent Wally Kogen in the 1999 episode "Sunday, Cruddy Sunday" for The Simpsons.

From 2001 to 2002, he played the father of five children on Maybe It's Me, and also guest-starred in an episode of The Weird Al Show. In 1985, he and Mull joined up again for the mockumentary The History of White People in America. He played Mayor Deebs in Roxanne, starring Steve Martin.

Sustained success

Willard appeared in several Christopher Guest films, such as A Mighty Wind, in which he played Mike LaFontaine (known for his catchphrase "Eh—whahappen'?"); Best in Show, where he played Buck Laughlin, a dog show announcer with an unending stream of bad jokes and off-color comments; Waiting for Guffman, playing Ron Albertson, a travel agent who performs in amateur stage productions with his wife; This Is Spinal Tap, where he played a lieutenant on the military base where Spinal Tap perform; and For Your Consideration as an obnoxious entertainment television show anchor. For his performance in Waiting for Guffman, Willard received an American Comedy Award nomination and a Screen Actors Guild nomination for Funniest Supporting Actor. He received the Boston Film Critics Award, an American Comedy Award, a Sierra Award and a tribute from AFI for his portrayal of Buck Laughlin in Best in Show. He also appeared in American Wedding, and as KVWN news director Ed Harken in Anchorman: The Legend of Ron Burgundy.

Willard had a recurring role as Hank MacDougall on the later seasons of CBS's Everybody Loves Raymond, which brought him Emmy Award nominations in 2003, 2004 and 2005. He also hosted a VH1 documentary series, Totally Obsessed, about people obsessed with their hobbies. He appeared as Captain Ribmanman in Episode 21 of Channel Frederator, a podcast from Kansas. He provided the voices of nudist family dad Dave Campbell in Family Guy (first in the episode "From Method to Madness"), and of Officer Brown in King of the Hill, and appeared on That '70s Show. On The Tonight Show with Jay Leno, Willard appeared in 100 sketches as a government official, businessman, or other authority figure who was always drinking. In 2006, he voiced Dad in the Academy Award nominated animated film Monster House. He also hosted Saturday Night Live in 1978 (with musical guests Devo), and appeared twice on MADtv.

He was the voice of a clueless companion to a lazy robot (Martin Mull) in one episode of the series Dexter's Laboratory and guest-starred on the Adult Swim cartoon Tom Goes to the Mayor. He acted in the Cartoon Network movie Re-Animated and played Vala Mal Doran's "father" in an episode of Stargate SG-1 in 2007. He appeared in two episodes of the Adult Swim program Tim and Eric Awesome Show, Great Job!. He also starred as the "Boogey Man" in an episode of The Grim Adventures of Billy and Mandy and reprised his role in a 2006 video game and the movie Billy & Mandy's Big Boogey Adventure. His final appearance as "Boogey" occurred in Billy & Mandy: Wrath of the Spider Queen. In 2007, he made a guest appearance on the children's TV series Come on Over. He also guest-starred on an episode of The Boondocks, providing the voice of "Joe Petto."

Willard was cast as a sportscaster in the television series Back to You, which premiered on the Fox Network on September 19, 2007. He played Shelby Forthright, the CEO of the Buy 'n' Large Corporation, in the first ever live-action speaking segments by Pixar in the animated film WALL-E. 

Willard completed a sold-out run of Fred Willard: Alone At Last!, advertised as a "one-man show" but actually featuring a cast of twelve, and received Los Angeles Artistic Director Awards for Best Comedy and Best Production. Willard had several stage roles to his credit, including Off-Broadway performances in Little Murders, directed by Alan Arkin, and Arf, directed by Richard Benjamin. His regional roles include Call Me Madam in Chicago and the musicals Promises, Promises, with Jason Alexander, and Anything Goes with Rachel York, both in Los Angeles. He starred in Wendy Wasserstein's Isn't It Romantic and off Broadway in Elvis and Juliet.

On October 5, 2008, he hosted the Nickelodeon Fido Awards.

Willard played Frank Dunphy, father of Phil (Ty Burrell), in several episodes of the show Modern Family. For his performance, he was nominated at the 62nd Primetime Emmy Awards for Outstanding Guest Actor in a Comedy Series and in the same category at the 72nd Primetime Creative Arts Emmy Awards (a posthumous nomination). 

On September 16, 2011, Willard was honored as a Pioneer in Comedy at Burbank International Film Festival. Also in 2011, Willard starred as "Santa Jack," a comical—and somewhat pervy—owner of a local Christmas carnival in episode 12 of the final season of The Closer.

In 2012, he played Al Kaiser in Rob Reiner's film The Magic of Belle Isle. In 2013, he starred in The Bird Men (originally called The Birder) alongside Tom Cavanagh, a film centered around a mild-mannered birder who seeks revenge on a younger rival, after losing the highly coveted Head of Ornithology position at the National Park.

Pacific Pioneer Broadcasters presented Willard with the Art Gilmore Career Achievement Award at their celebrity luncheon on June 19, 2015.

Willard joined Ed Begley Jr. and Michael McKean for the HBO documentary-style comedy Family Tree from Christopher Guest.

On August 10, 2018, Willard made a special guest appearance on Jimmy Kimmel Live!, reprising his role from a 1970s television pilot for an unmade series called Space Force, in light of President Donald Trump's announcement that he will create a space force for the United States military. Following the sketch, Willard made guest appearances on the show on a frequent basis, often portraying comedic, misguided characters parodying current news topics which Jimmy would interview "live via satellite". The characters included the ghosts of Fred Trump and George Washington, a Trump-supporting Santa Claus, and Supreme Court Justice Ruth Bader Ginsburg.

On October 23, 2019, it was announced that Willard was cast as Fred Naird in the 2020 Netflix comedy series, Space Force. This was Willard's final acting role, with the series being released two weeks after his death.

Willard's final voice-acting performance was in the 2017 Disney animated cartoon Mickey and the Roadster Racers as the character Mr. Doozy.

Personal life
Willard was married to Mary Lovell from 1968 until her death in 2018, aged 71. They had a daughter and a grandson.

Legal issues
On July 18, 2012, Willard was arrested on suspicion of engaging in a misdemeanor lewd act in an adult theater on Santa Monica Boulevard and was brought to the Los Angeles Police Department's Hollywood Station. However, there was no proof of any misconduct and no charges were filed. Despite the outcomes, PBS fired Willard from Market Warriors immediately following his arrest, and Mark L. Walberg replaced him on the show. In an appearance on Late Night with Jimmy Fallon shortly thereafter, Willard stated that the incident was "very painful" and "very embarrassing", but that he "did nothing wrong". Willard was subsequently required to take a sex education diversion program.

Death
Willard died at his home in Los Angeles on May 15, 2020, at age 86, according to his daughter and his representative. The cause of death was subsequently reported as cardiac arrest, with coronary artery disease and myelodysplastic syndrome listed as contributing factors. Jamie Lee Curtis—whose husband, Christopher Guest, frequently worked with Willard—first shared news of the actor's death.

Willard is buried in the Forest Lawn Memorial Park in Hollywood Hills.

Filmography

Film

Television

Video games

Notes

References

External links

 FredWillard.com Official Site 
 
 Fred Willard interviewed on WTF with Marc Maron episode 262 (video excerpt from this interview)
 
 
 Fred Willard at Find a Grave

1933 births
2020 deaths
20th-century American comedians
20th-century American male actors
21st-century American comedians
21st-century American male actors
Actors from Shaker Heights, Ohio
Age controversies
American male comedians
American male film actors
American male television actors
American male video game actors
American male voice actors
Burials at Forest Lawn Memorial Park (Hollywood Hills)
Comedians from Ohio
Daytime Emmy Award for Outstanding Guest Performer in a Drama Series winners
Daytime Emmy Award winners
Deaths from coronary artery disease
Deaths from myelodysplastic syndrome
Deaths from cancer in California
Male actors from Cleveland
Military personnel from Cleveland
United States Army soldiers
Virginia Military Institute alumni